David Gerald Criscione (born September 2, 1951) is a former Major League Baseball catcher.

Criscione hit just one major league home run, but it was a walk-off home run against the Milwaukee Brewers on July 25, 1977. After Andrés Mora pinch-hit for starting catcher Dave Skaggs in the bottom of the 9th inning, Billy Smith tied the game at 3-3 with a single. In the top of the 10th, Criscione entered the game on defense. With the score still tied 3-3 in the bottom of the 11th, Criscione came to bat against Sam Hinds of the Brewers with one out and homered to win the game.
Criscione later went on to be a long-time coach of the SUNY Fredonia Blue Devils, a Division III college baseball team near Buffalo, New York.

References

External links

Major League Baseball catchers
Baltimore Orioles players
Geneva Senators players
Anderson Senators players
Burlington Rangers players
Pittsfield Rangers players
Spokane Indians players
Sacramento Solons players
Rochester Red Wings players
Baseball players from New York (state)
1951 births
Living people
People from Dunkirk, New York